She-Wolves of the Wasteland, also known as Phoenix the Warrior and She Wolves of the Wasteland, is a 1988 American post apocalyptic film directed by Robert Hayes and starring Persis Khambatta, Kathleen Kinmont and Peggy McIntaggart.

Synopsis
A group of women battle to save the world in a post-apocalyptic wasteland. They battle for the touch of the last man left alive.

Cast

Releases
It debuted on VHS in 1988 with the title Phoenix the Warrior.

Echo Bridge Entertainment released it on DVD in the US on November 6, 2007.

References

Further reading

External links
 

1988 films
1980s science fiction action films
American erotic films
American science fiction action films
1980s English-language films
American post-apocalyptic films
American sexploitation films
1980s erotic films
1980s American films